LaMonte, Lamonte or La Monte may refer to the following people:

Surname
Bob LaMonte, American sports agent 
Collene Lamonte, American politician from Michigan
Francesca LaMonte (1895–1982), American ichthyologist
Karen LaMonte (born 1967), American artist 
George M. La Monte (1863–1927), American businessman, philanthropist, and politician

Given name
Lamonte McLemore (born 1939), member of the American vocal group The 5th Dimension
LaMonte Ulmer (born 1986), American professional basketball player
La Monte Young (born 1935) American musician and artist

See also
Lamonte trevallis, a trace fossil

See also
Lamont (disambiguation)
Monte (disambiguation)

Masculine given names